Juansilvaite is a very rare, complex arsenate-sulfate mineral with formula Na5Al3[AsO3(OH)]4[AsO2(OH)2]2(SO4)2·4H2O. It is both hydroxyarsenate and dihydroxyarsenate. It is among few relatively new minerals from the Torrecillas mine in Chile, the other being torrecillasite, canutite, chongite, gajardoite, leverettite, and magnesiokoritnigite. Although having quite common among minerals space group C2/c, juansilvaite has a new type of structure.

References

Sodium minerals
Aluminium minerals
Arsenate minerals
Monoclinic minerals
Minerals in space group 15
Minerals described in 2017